Yusuf Cassim is a South African Democratic Alliance politician, a Member of Parliament (MP) and the Federal Leader of the DA's Student Organisation (DASO) and a former interim Leader of the DA Youth, who took over the position when Mbali Ntuli stepped down. He is the former President of the Nelson Mandela Student's Representative Council 2012. Cassim is also the party's MP for Higher Education.

References

1990 births
Living people
Democratic Alliance (South Africa) politicians
South African politicians of Indian descent
Members of the National Assembly of South Africa
Members of the Eastern Cape Provincial Legislature